Two vessels of the Royal Australian Navy have been named HMAS Broome, for the town of Broome, Western Australia.

, a Bathurst-class corvette which operated from 1942 until 1946, when she was sold to the Turkish Navy
, an Armidale-class patrol boat that entered service in 2007 and is active as of 2016

Battle honours
Two battle honours were awarded to the first HMAS Broome; these are inherited by subsequent ships of the name:
Pacific 1942–45
New Guinea 1942–44

See also
, a destroyer of the United States Navy

References

Royal Australian Navy ship names